Morris H. "Morrie" Mills (born September 25, 1929) is an American former politician from the state of Indiana. A Republican, he served in the Indiana General Assembly from 1968 to 2000.

References

Living people
1929 births
Republican Party Indiana state senators
Harvard Business School alumni
Earlham College alumni